The European ordering rules (EOR / EN 13710), define an ordering for strings written in languages that are written with the Latin, Greek and Cyrillic alphabets. The standard covers languages used by the European Union, the European Free Trade Association, and parts of the former Soviet Union. It is a tailoring of the Common Tailorable Template of ISO/IEC 14651. EOR can in turn be tailored for different (European) languages. But in inter-European contexts, EOR can be used without further tailoring.

Method

Just as for ISO/IEC 14651, upon which EOR is based, EOR has 4 levels of weights.

Level 1 sorts the letters. The following Latin letters are concerned by this level, in order:

a b c d ð e ə ɛ f g h i j k l m n o ɔ p q r s ɯ t u v w x y z þ æ

The Greek alphabet has the following order:

α β γ δ ε Ϝ Ϛ ζ η θ ι κ λ μ ν ξ ο π Ϟ ρ σ τ υ φ χ ψ ω Ϡ

Cyrillic script has the following order:

а ӑ ӓ ә ӛ ӕ б в г ғ ҕ ґ д ђ ҙ е ӗ ё є є̈ ж ӝ җ ӂ з ӟ з́ ѕ ӡ и ӥ і ї й ј к қ ӄ ҡ ҟ ҝ л љ ꙥ м ꙧ н ң ӊ ҥ њ ӈ о ӧ ŏ ө ӫ ө̆ ѡ ꙍ ҩ п ҧ р с ҫ с́ т ҭ ћ у ў ӱ ӳ ү ұ ф х ҳ ӽ ѯ һ ц ҵ ч ӵ ҷ ӌ ҹ ҽ ҿ џ ш щ ъ ы ӹ ь ѣ э ю ю̆ я я̆ Ӏ ѫ ѭ ѧ ѩ ѱ ѳ ѵ ѷ ҁ ꙟ

The order for the three alphabets is:
 Latin alphabet
 Greek alphabet
 Cyrillic alphabet

The Georgian and Armenian alphabets have not been included in ENV 13710. However, they are covered in CR 14400:2001 "European ordering rules – Ordering for Latin, Greek, Cyrillic, Georgian and Armenian scripts". All scripts encoded in ISO/IEC 10646 and Unicode are covered by ISO/IEC 14651 (and its datafile CTT) as well as Unicode collation algorithm (UCA and the associated DUCET), both of which are available at no charge.

Level 2 is where different additions, such as diacritics and variations, to the letters are ordered.

Level 2 defines the following order of diacritics and other modifications:
 Acute accent (á)
 Grave accent (à)
 Breve (ă)
 Circumflex (â)
 Caron (š)
 Ring (å)
 Diaeresis (ä)
 Double acute accent (ő)
 Tilde (ã)
 Dot (ż)
 Cedilla (ş)
 Ogonek (ą)
 Macron (ā)
 With stroke through (ø)
 Modified letter(s) (æ)

Level 3 makes the distinction between Capital and small letters, as in "Polish" and "polish".

Level 4 concerns punctuation and whitespace characters. This level makes the distinction between "MacDonald" and "Mac Donald", "its" and "it's".

An optional, and usually omitted, fifth level can distinguish typographical differences, including whether the text is italic, normal or bold.

See also
 Collation
 Common Locale Data Repository (CLDR)
 Unicode
 Universal Character Set
 DIN 91379 – a European Unicode subset (also includes Greek and Cyrillic for Bulgarian), uses UTF-8 at interfaces, normalization form C (NFC) – a German 2022 standard; will be mandatory for German authorities and organizations in the exchange of data from 1 November 2024
 UTF-8

References

Notes

 Hansson, Roger; Lindgren, Carl Göran; Ljung, Heléne; Lundén, Thomas. Språk och skrift i Europa. SNS Förlag. (2004) 
 Küster, Marc Wilhelm: Geordnetes Weltbild. Die Tradition des alphabetischen Sortierens von der Keilschrift bis zur EDV. Eine Kulturgeschichte. Niemeyer (2006) . Written by the editor of ENV 13710, it discusses in chapter 17.4 the genesis and the contents of the EOR. Cf. also , in particular also

External links
 European Ordering Rules, ENV 13710 – a "European Pre-Standard" 

Library science
Collation